André Turpin (born 1966) is a French Canadian cinematographer, film director, and screenwriter.

Career 
As a cinematographer, he has won over a dozen awards, including Canadian Screen Awards for Best Cinematography his work on Xavier Dolan's films Mommy (2014) and It's Only the End of the World (2016). He has also won two Genie Awards for Best Cinematography, for Maelström (2000) at the 21st Genie Awards and for Incendies (2010) at the 31st Genie Awards.

In 2015, he was the cinematographer on Adele's music video for "Hello", for which he received an MTV Video Music Award nomination for Best Cinematography at the 2016 MTV Video Music Awards.

As a director and screenwriter, he is best known for his work on the 2001 film Soft Shell Man (Un crabe dans la tête), which was chosen as Canada's submission to the Academy Award for Best Foreign Language Film at the 75th Academy Awards, though it was not ultimately nominated. The film also received nominations for Best Picture and Best Screenplay at the 22nd Genie Awards, and won several Jutra Awards, including Best Director, Best Screenplay, and Best Cinematography.

At the 2nd Canadian Screen Awards, Turpin and Anaïs Barbeau-Lavalette were nominated for the Canadian Screen Award for Best Live Action Short Drama for their short film Ina Litovski.

Personal life
He is married to film director Louise Archambault.

Filmography

Cinematographer
1992 - Croix de bois
1993 - Because Why
1995 - Zigrail
1996 - Cosmos
1997 - The Countess of Baton Rouge (La Comtesse de Bâton Rouge)
1998 - August 32nd on Earth (Un 32 août sur terre)
1999 - Atomic Saké
1999 - Matroni and Me (Matroni et moi)
2000 - Maelström
2001 - Soft Shell Man (Un crabe dans la tête)
2004 - Childstar
2005 - Familia
2006 - Congorama
2008 - It's Not Me, I Swear! (C'est pas moi, je le jure!)
2010 - Incendies
2012 - Ina Litovski
2013 - Remember Me (Mémorable moi)
2013 - Whitewash
2013 - Tom at the Farm (Tom à la ferme)
2014 - Mommy
2015 - "Hello" (Music video for Adele)
2016 - It's Only the End of the World (Juste la fin du monde)
2018 - The Death and Life of John F. Donovan
2019 - Matthias & Maxime
2019 - Playmobil: The Movie
2022 - The Night Logan Woke Up (La nuit où Laurier Gaudreault s'est réveillé)

Director
1995 - Zigrail
1996 - Cosmos ("Jules & Fanny")
2001 - Soft Shell Man (Un crabe dans la tête)
2012 - Ina Litovski
2012 - Sept heures trois fois par année
2014 - Prends-moi
2015 - Endorphine

References

External links

Canadian cinematographers
Canadian screenwriters in French
Film directors from Quebec
Writers from Quebec
French Quebecers
Living people
Best Cinematography Genie and Canadian Screen Award winners
1966 births
Best Cinematography Jutra and Iris Award winners
Best Director Jutra and Iris Award winners